Gehaktdag was a Dutch television show. It was aired on Fridays on Nederland 3 by the AVRO. In the show, a Dutch celebrity is satirically critiqued by two teams. The show was presented by Ruben Nicolai and the team captains were Tijl Beckand and Horace Cohen. The show first aired on 12 February 2010 and ran until 9 April 2010. In total, nine episodes were broadcast.

Overview 

The show consists of three rounds, regarding the guest's past, present and future, and in each round, a team member holds a satirical monologue. A point is awarded based on the response of the studio audience using a clap-o-meter. However, the measurements of the clap-o-meter are never shown to the viewers. It is not uncommon for the speaker to make fun of team members or members of the other team, in particular to Horace Cohen.

Guests included Rita Verdonk, Sander Lantinga and Martin Simek.

List of episodes 

Each episode features one guest, in chronological order:

 Rita Verdonk
 Tatjana Simić
 Sander Lantinga
 Patricia Paay
 Martin Simek
 Lange Frans
 Wilma Nanninga
 Stacey Rookhuizen
 Prem Radhakishun

See also 
 Roast (comedy)

External links 
 Gehaktdag

Dutch comedy television series
2010s Dutch television series
2010 Dutch television series debuts
2010 Dutch television series endings
Dutch-language television shows
NPO 3 original programming